Penguin Lost is a novel by Andrey Kurkov.  Originally published in 2005 in Russian (as Закон улитки), it was translated by George Bird and published in English in 2010. It is the sequel to the author's novel Death and the Penguin.

Summary
The novel follows the life of a writer, Viktor Alekseyevich Zolotaryov, in a struggling post-Soviet society. Fleeing from the mafia to the Faraday Station in Antarctica, Viktor passes some time in a polar research station, before returning to Kyiv with a new identity. Back in Ukraine and needing a job, he starts work on the election campaign for a Mafia boss. In return he is given information as to the whereabouts of Misha, his pet penguin, which is said to be in a zoo in Chechnya. Thus begins another journey, this time across the former Soviet Union, in pursuit of his beloved pet.

The original Russian-language title of the book, The Snail Law, refers to the Mafia boss' saying that every person should have his or her own shell (that is, a protecting mob group) and he / she is alive only as long as the "shell" is not lost. 

The Complete Review said of the novel:

References

External links
 Michel Faber, "The bird has flown". Review in The Guardian, 20 March 2004.
 Lesley Chamberlain, "Penguin Lost, by Andrey Kurkov, trans. George Bird". Review in The Independent, 16 April 2004.

1997 novels
Satirical novels
Books about penguins
Novels by Andrey Kurkov
Novels set in Kyiv